Admiral Sir Richard Hussey Bickerton, 2nd Baronet, KCB, (11 October 1759 – 9 February 1832) was a British naval officer. He was born in Southampton, the son of Vice-admiral Sir Richard Bickerton and first served aboard HMS Medway in June 1774, in the Mediterranean. His first command came in March 1779 when he was given HM Sloop Swallow as a reward for his part in an engagement with a much larger opponent. Bickerton later joined Rodney's squadron in the West Indies where he took part in the capture of Sint Eustatius in 1781. Making post captain on 8 February 1781, he took temporary command of HMS Invincible and fought in her at the Battle of Fort Royal on 29 April 1781.

When Britain entered the French Revolutionary War in 1793, Bickerton joined the Channel Fleet before, in October 1794, being ordered to transport General Sir John Vaughan to the West Indies, to take command of British land forces there. After another spell in home waters, Bickerton was sent to the Mediterranean where he spent much of the war on blockade duty and, after their surrender, oversaw the evacuation of French forces from Alexandria. He remained in the Mediterranean during the short-lived peace and when hostilities renewed was second in command to Lord Nelson there.

Forced ashore by illness in 1805, Bickerton first served as a Lord of the Admiralty and First Naval Lord before finishing his naval career as Commander-in-Chief, Portsmouth, having attained the rank of full admiral in 1812.

Personal life
Richard Bickerton was born in Southampton on 11 October 1759, the only surviving son of Vice-admiral Sir Richard Bickerton and Mary Anne Hussey.

On 25 September 1788, he married Anne, daughter of Dr James Athill of Antigua. Bickerton succeeded as 2nd Baronet in 1792 when his father died. He was elected a Fellow of the Royal Society in 1810. On 2 January 1815, Bickerton was made a Knight Commander of the Order of the Bath then later, in May 1823, he inherited the estate of Wood Walton and on doing so began using his mother's maiden name before his own surname.

Naval career
Bickerton joined the Royal Navy, aged 12, on 14 December 1771, although this was in name only: He was entered in the muster of his father's ships, Marlborough and later Princess Augusta, but did not actually serve until June 1774, when he joined HMS Medway as a captain's servant. Subsequently, promoted to midshipman, he served under Captain William Affleck in the Mediterranean, returning home in 1777 on board Invincible, commanded by Hyde Parker.

Master and Commander
Bickerton was promoted to lieutenant on 16 December 1777 and served under Charles Middleton first on board the 90-gun HMS Prince George, then the seventy-four, Royal Oak in March 1778. In May, Bickerton joined HMS Jupiter in the Bay of Biscay, and when Charles Middleton was appointed comptroller of the navy, he recommended that Bickerton be appointed first lieutenant under the command of Francis Reynolds.

On 20 October Jupiter attacked the much larger French ship-of-the-line Triton, forcing her to retire; as a reward for his conduct, Bickerton, on Middleton's recommendation, was in March 1779, promoted master and given command of the sloop, HMS Swallow. Swallow spent just under two years in The Channel, cruising and undertaking escort duties. While on convoy duty during the Summer of 1779, Bickerton gave the order to disperse, having heard of the arrival of the combined Franco-Spanish fleet in The Channel. His prompt action allowed the convoy to escape. After assisting in the capture of a Dutch convoy, on 2 January 1780, Bickerton and his vessel were sent to the West Indies to join Rodney's squadron and subsequently take part in the capture of Sint Eustatius in 1781.

Post Captain
Rodney promoted Bickerton to the rank of post captain on 8 February 1781 and gave him temporary command of HMS Invincible. It was in her that Bickerton took part in the Battle of Fort Royal, an action fought on 29 April 1781, off the coast of Martinique. Bickerton acquired his own ship, HMS Russell, in May, before briefly transferring to Terrible but, finding her unfit, moved to the frigate, HMS Amazon, in July. After service in the Leeward Islands and North American waters, Bickerton returned to England in Amazon, arriving in Portsmouth in February 1782. In September, Bickerton was given the newly repaired HMS Brune; she was decommissioned in May the following year and Bickerton was without a ship until January 1787, when he commissioned HMS Sibyl and in her sailed for the Leeward Islands once more.

French Revolutionary War
When France declared war in 1793, Bickerton was given command of HMS Ruby and served in her in The Channel until September 1794 when he moved to HMS Ramillies and joined Lord Howe in the Bay of Biscay. In October 1794 he transported General Sir John Vaughan to the West Indies, to succeed Lieutenant-general Sir Charles Grey as the Commander-in-chief of British land forces there. Bickerton remained on this station until July 1795, when he was sent to Newfoundland. Bickerton returned home in November 1795 where he joined Admiral Adam Duncan's fleet on blockade duty in the North Sea. Bickerton served under Duncan for the whole of the following year, then in 1797, he and his ship transferred to the Channel Fleet under Admiral Alexander Hood. In 1798, Bickerton took command of the new HMS Terrible, built in 1785 to replace the old Terrible, scuttled after the Battle of Chesapeake. Later in 1798, Bickerton was given the title of Colonel of Marines, then on 14 February 1799, Bickerton attained the rank of rear-admiral and, towards the end of the year, took up the position of Assistant Port Admiral at Portsmouth.

Service in the Mediterranean

Bickerton hoisted his flag in Seahorse on 13 May 1800 and was ordered to transport generals Abercromby, Moore and Hutchinson to the Mediterranean; after which he spent the rest of the war under Lord Keith, on blockade duty. On 10 June, Bickerton transferred his flag to the 74-gun Swiftsure and began a five-month command of a squadron off Cádiz. During 1801, he worked on HMS Kent, maintaining a blockade on the port of Alexandria until its capitulation on 27 August. He provided support during this time for Lieutenant-General Hutchinson.

Left to oversee the French withdrawal, Bickerton conducted this duty with such efficiency that he earned the respect of the French general, Jacques-François Menou, who also acknowledged that, " ...the vigilance of Sir Richard's squadron had accelerated the reduction of that place, as it cut them off from all supply". For his part in the British victory, the grateful Turks awarded Bickerton with the Order of the Crescent on 8 October 1801. Following the Treaty of Amiens, Bickerton was left behind in command of the Mediterranean Fleet.

Napoleonic Wars
By 1804, still in the Mediterranean and having transferred to Royal Sovereign, Bickerton was serving as Second-in-Command to Admiral Lord Nelson, maintaining a close blockade on the French port of Toulon and when Nelson received the thanks of the Corporation of London, he insisted that Bickerton received equal recognition. Bickerton was elevated to Commander-in-Chief in the Mediterranean when Nelson left to pursue the French Fleet across the Atlantic.

Later career
In spring 1805, a liver complaint forced Bickerton to return to England. He was promoted to vice-admiral on 9 November 1805 and then appointed to the Board of Admiralty in April 1807. He became First Naval Lord in the second Portland ministry in May 1808. On 31 July 1810 Bickerton attained the rank of full admiral and in March 1812 he left the Admiralty Board and, one month later, was appointed Commander-in-Chief, Portsmouth with Puissant as his flagship. Bickerton still held this post in 1814 when the Treaty of Paris was celebrated with a Grand Naval Review at Spithead, which was his last active service. The event took place on 24 and 25 June, before the Prince Regent and his allies. Bickerton was appointed a Knight Commander of the Order of the Bath (KCB) on 2 January 1815. On 5 January 1818 Bickerton was promoted to Lieutenant-general of the Marines, then General of the Marines in June 1830.

Political career 
Bickerton was elected a Conservative Member of Parliament for Poole in February 1808, but he did not run for re-election in 1812. He did not often speak in Parliamentary debates, except on naval issues.

Death

Bickerton died at his home, No. 15 The Circus, Bath, at the age of 72 on 9 February 1832. His wife outlived him, dying on 2 March 1850. As the couple had no children, the estate passed to Anne's nephew, Vice-admiral Sir Richard Hussey Moubray. The lack of male issue also meant the baronetcy became extinct with his death.

A memorial to Bickerton, by Francis Leggatt Chantrey, was erected in Bath Abbey in 1834. Bickerton Island off the east coast of Australia's Northern Territory was named for him by the British navigator and cartographer, Matthew Flinders, who was the first to circumnavigate the continent.

Notes

References

Sources

External links 

 

|-

|-

|-

1759 births
1832 deaths
Baronets in the Baronetage of Great Britain
Lords of the Admiralty
Members of the Parliament of the United Kingdom for English constituencies
Royal Navy admirals
UK MPs 1807–1812
Royal Navy personnel of the French Revolutionary Wars
Fellows of the Royal Society
Knights of the Order of the Crescent
British naval commanders of the Napoleonic Wars